Our Lady of Mercy College, Burraneer (also OLMC or OLMC Burraneer) is an all-girls 7–10 school situated on Burraneer Bay, in Sydney's southern suburbs, Australia. Our Lady of Mercy College, Burraneer is a Newman Selective Roman Catholic School. It was founded by in 1932 by the Sisters of Mercy.  In 1960, the college moved to its current location in Burraneer Bay. The current enrolment is ~550.

OLMC, along with De La Salle College Caringbah, is an official feeder school to De La Salle College (Cronulla, NSW) for senior schooling in years 11 and 12.

The college is affiliated with the Australasian Mercy Secondary Schools Association (AMSSA), Shire Combined Catholic Colleges (SCCC), Southern Sydney Combined Catholic Colleges (SSCCC) and NSW Combined Catholic Colleges (NSWCCC).

History 
The college was established in 1935 by the Sisters of Mercy (Parramatta) in a cottage at 6 Coast Avenue, Cronulla. The earliest known enrolment was sixteen girls. OLMC operated as a small boarding school until 1939 when it was closed during World War II. It was reopened in 1945 as a small day school, and boarding was discontinued in 1951.

In 1959, the Sisters of Mercy purchased the college's current property at Burraneer Bay, which was officially opened and blessed in 1960. In 1972, the college acquired the property on the northern side of Dominic Street. In the early 1980s, the Sisters of Mercy moved out of the Convent, allowing the school to extend into this part of the building.

In 1989, the College introduced a new uniform, replacing yellow and brown with the current uniform and school colours of blue, red and white.

Extensive building work on the northern side of the grounds was completed in 2003 with the opening of a new multi-purpose centre, The Mercy Centre, along with new music and practice rooms and four general classrooms. Major building work in 2014 and 2015 transformed the Marcy Centre into a performing arts centre with a new stage and two recording studios. The Catherine McAuley building was completed in 2016 and officially opened in 2017, with three science laboratories, four design and technology rooms, five flexible general classrooms and an open learning space.

Principals

Houses
There are four houses at Our Lady of Mercy College, Burraneer: Carita, Coolock, McAuley and Mercedes. Each house is named in reference to the Mercy Tradition. 
Carita - (Red) 
Motto: Actions speak louder than words
 
Carita is named after the word 'Caritas' meaning charity. The emblem of two hands holding a heart is a symbol of charity and almsgiving.

Coolock - (Green) 
Motto: Friendship, love and loyalty
 
Coolock is named after ‘Coolock House’, situated in Dublin, Ireland and inherited by Catherine McAuley. It provided a site for McAuley to protect and educate poor women and children.

McAuley - (Yellow) 
Motto: Strength through compassion
 
McAuley is named after Catherine McAuley who was the founder of the Sisters of Mercy. The emblem for McAuley is the lotus flower, which symbolises compassion, courage, mindfulness, peace, and wisdom.

Mercedes - (Blue) 
Motto: Act justly, love mercy, walk humbly

Mercedes ('mercy' in Spanish) house was named after the congregation of the Sisters of Mercy, which was established by Catherine McAuley in 1831 for the visitation of the sick, poor and the charitable instruction of women. The emblem is the Irish trinity knot.

References

External links
 

Educational institutions established in 1932
Girls' schools in New South Wales
Catholic secondary schools in Sydney
Sisters of Mercy schools
1932 establishments in Australia
Sutherland Shire